Rosé All Day is an upcoming American comedy film written by Katie Amanda Keane and directed by Marla Sokoloff. The film stars Chelsea Alden, Veronica Dunne, Jenna Uskowitz, Alice Hunter, Briana Cuoco and Cameron Kelly.

Cast
 Chelsea Alden
 Veronica Dunne
 Jenna Ushkowitz
 Alice Hunter
 Briana Cuoco
 Cameron Kelly
 Avery Norris

Production
On February 2, 2021, it was announced that Chelsea Alden, Veronica Dunne, Jenna Uskowitz, Alice Hunter, Briana Cuoco and Cameron Kelly joins to the cast of the film.

The film was set to start production in February 2021, but was pushed due to COVID-19 concerns. Principal photography began on March 17, 2021 and expect to conclude on April 24, 2021 in Encino, California.

References

External Links

Upcoming films
American comedy films